Cheaha Mountain , often called Mount Cheaha, is the highest natural point in the U.S. state of Alabama. It is located a few miles northwest of the town of Delta in Cheaha State Park, which offers a lodge, a restaurant, and other amenities.

Description
The highest point is marked with a USGS benchmark in front of Bunker Tower, a stone Civilian Conservation Corps building with an observation deck on top.  The CCC also constructed a road to Cheaha, but the road has been closed for years.  The old road is known as CC Road and contains interesting ruins.  Near the peak is Bald Rock, which was recently improved with a wheelchair-accessible wooden walkway that provides an impressive overlook of the surrounding region.  The entire area gives an impression of being at a much higher elevation than it actually is, in part because of the relatively low elevation of the adjacent area to the west.

Cheaha Mountain is part of the Talladega Mountains, a final southern segment of the Blue Ridge Mountains, unlike other elevations of the Appalachians in north Alabama, which are part of the Cumberland Plateau. The mountain is the highest point in the eastern portion of the Sun Belt (east of the Mississippi River, south of Interstate 20, and north of the Gulf of Mexico). Geologically it is composed of weakly metamorphosed sandstones and conglomerates of the Cheaha quartzite, of Silurian / Devonian age, and stands high topographically due to the erosional resistance of these rocks. The soil, only moderately deep, is a brown stony silt loam of the Cheaha series; it is well drained and very strongly acidic.

The mountain was opened to the public as part of Cheaha State Park on June 7, 1939.

The mountain is a host to several commercial and public service transmitters. These radio antennas, along with sundry structures dating back to commercial schemes by the state of Alabama in the 1970s, stand in stark contrast to the surrounding natural environment.

See also
 
 
 
 List of U.S. states by elevation

References

External links

 Images from Cheaha and Cleburne County
 Cheaha State Park

Landforms of Cleburne County, Alabama
Mountains of Alabama
Civilian Conservation Corps in Alabama
Highest points of U.S. states
State parks of Alabama
Protected areas established in 1939
1939 establishments in Alabama
Alabama placenames of Native American origin